Jaak Van Velthoven (24 January 1951) is a Belgian former professional motocross racer. He competed in the Motocross World Championships from 1970 to 1983.

Van Velthoven was born in Lommel, Belgium. His best individual performance was a third place in the 500cc World Championship in 1973 with the Yamaha factory racing team. He helped Yamaha develop a revolutionary motorcycle rear suspension that used a single shock absorber (invented by the Belgian engineer Lucien Tilkens) instead of the traditional dual shock absorbers.

Van Velthoven also rode for the Husqvarna and KTM factory racing teams. He was a member of four winning Belgian teams at the Motocross des Nations in 1972, 1973, 1976 and 1977. Standing well over 6 feet tall, it was not difficult to distinguish him in the pack and he was often referred to as 'Long tall Jaak'.

References

Sportspeople from Limburg (Belgium)
People from Lommel
Belgian motocross riders
Living people
1951 births